Alan Handford-Rice (19 September 1925 – December 2000) was a Kenyan sports shooter. He competed in the 25 metre pistol event at the 1964 Summer Olympics.

References

1925 births
2000 deaths
Kenyan male sport shooters
Olympic shooters of Kenya
Shooters at the 1964 Summer Olympics
Commonwealth Games competitors for Kenya
Shooters at the 1966 British Empire and Commonwealth Games
British expatriates in Kenya
20th-century Kenyan people